Veijo Olavi Puhjo (26 June 1948 – 9 December 2019) was a Finnish politician who was a member of Finnish Parliament, representing the Left Alliance. He was elected to the parliament in 1995 and left after the 2011 election. Puhjo was a physician by profession. He graduated from the Greifswald Medical School of the University of Greifswald in Germany.

External links
Parliament of Finland: Veijo Puhjo

1948 births
2019 deaths
People from Loimaa
Left Alliance (Finland) politicians
Members of the Parliament of Finland (1995–99)
Members of the Parliament of Finland (1999–2003)
Members of the Parliament of Finland (2003–07)
Members of the Parliament of Finland (2007–11)
20th-century Finnish physicians
University of Greifswald alumni